The Roll Flight MR V is a German powered parachute that was designed by Martin Rütter and produced by Roll Flight of Schwelm. A two-seat version is known as the Duo. The aircraft is supplied as a complete ready-to-fly-aircraft.

Design and development
It typically uses a  parachute-style wing, but a variety of wings can be used and the choice determines the aircraft's gross weight. It features two-seats-in-tandem or single-place accommodation, tricycle landing gear and is set up to accept a single  Hirth F-33 engine in pusher configuration.

The aircraft carriage is built from metal tubing. In flight steering is accomplished via handles that actuate the canopy brakes, creating roll and yaw. On the ground the aircraft has pedal-controlled nosewheel steering. The main landing gear incorporates spring rod suspension.

Variants
MR V
Single-seat version
Duo
Two-seat version

Specifications (Duo)

References

MR V
2000s German sport aircraft
2000s German ultralight aircraft
Single-engined pusher aircraft
Powered parachutes